Lazybones is a 1925 American silent romantic drama film produced and directed by Frank Borzage and starring Madge Bellamy, Buck Jones, and Zasu Pitts. It opened in New York City on September 22, 1924, and received wider distribution by Fox Film Corporation during 1925.

Plot
Set around 1900, the titular Lazybones is in love with Agnes. Her sister, Ruth, returns home with a child and a story about marrying a seaman who was lost at sea. She attempts suicide by jumping in the river, but Lazybones saves her and, taking pity on the child, Kit, adopts her without revealing her true mother. Agnes and Ruth's mother is very strict and when told by Ruth of the child, strikes her with a cane. As the years pass, Ruth dies and Lazybones goes off to World War I. When he returns, intending to marry Kit now that she is grown up, he finds that she is in love with Dick Ritchie.

Cast

Preservation
Prints held at Archives Du Film Du CNC (or Bois d'Arcy), Cinematheque Royale de Belgique, Brussels, the Museum of Modern Art, and the George Eastman Museum.

References

External links

American films based on plays
American black-and-white films
American silent feature films
Fox Film films
Films directed by Frank Borzage
American romantic drama films
1925 romantic drama films
1925 films
1920s American films
Silent romantic drama films
Silent American drama films